Janauschek is a surname. Notable people with the name include:

 Fanny Janauschek (1829–1904), Czech-American actress
 Leopold Janauschek (1827–1898), Austrian historian